Idalou is a city in Lubbock County, Texas, United States. The population was 2,250 at the 2010 census. It is part of the Lubbock Metropolitan Statistical Area.

History
Idalou began as a settlement around a depot on the South Plains and Santa Fe Railway in the early 1910s, and within a few years had a one-room schoolhouse and several businesses. The first post office was opened in 1917, and in 1919, a two-story brick school was built after the original school burned down. Incorporated in 1925 with 538 residents, the town grew to 2,348 residents by 1980 and has remained above 2,000 residents in the years since.

Idalou has a post office, library, city park and pool, EMS station, fire department, co-op cotton gin, grocery store, and many other businesses. The town serves as an agricultural center for cotton farming in northeast Lubbock County, with many of the residents employed in farming and farming-related occupations. Due to its close proximity to Lubbock, many residents work in the nearby city.

The town was named for Ida and Lou Bassett, sisters of Julian M. Bassett, vice president of the Crosby-Bassett Livestock Company, during the 1910s.

Geography

Idalou is located at  (33.661938, –101.684234).

Demographics

2020 census

As of the 2020 United States census, there were 2,193 people, 736 households, and 466 families residing in the city.

2000 census
As of the census of 2000,  2,157 people, 796 households, and 593 families resided in the city. The population density was 2,201.5 people per square mile (849.8/km). The 851 housing units averaged 868.6 per square mile (335.3/km). The racial makeup of the city was 70.00% White, 0.60% African American, 0.70% Native American, 0.14% Asian, 0.14% Pacific Islander, 26.94% from other races, and 1.48% from two or more races. Hispanics or Latinos of any race were 42.98% of the population.

Of the 796 households, 36.8% had children under the age of 18 living with them, 60.1% were married couples living together, 10.7% had a female householder with no husband present, and 25.4% were not families. About 24.2% of all households were made up of individuals, and 12.8% had someone living alone who was 65 years of age or older. The average household size was 2.71 and the average family size was 3.22.

In the city, the population was distributed as 29.3% under the age of 18, 7.8% from 18 to 24, 25.5% from 25 to 44, 23.3% from 45 to 64, and 14.0% who were 65 years of age or older. The median age was 37 years. For every 100 females, there were 87.6 males. For every 100 females age 18 and over, there were 82.6 males.

The median income for a household in the city was $34,167, and for a family was $39,766. Males had a median income of $29,556 versus $20,150 for females. The per capita income for the city was $14,664. About 10.2% of families and 11.2% of the population were below the poverty line, including 12.2% of those under age 18 and 10.9% of those age 65 or over.

Education
Idalou is served by the Idalou Independent School District.

In popular culture
The town is depicted in the song "Idalou" by the Josh Abbott Band, from the album Small Town Family Dream (2012).

It's also featured in the song "Amarillo Highway (for Dave Hickey)" by Terry Allen on the album Lubbock (on everything) (1979), in the opening lyric, "Well, I'm a high straight in Plainview, side bet in Idalou, and a fresh deck in New Deal."

References

External links
 City of Idalou official website
 Idalou Independent School District
 Handbook of Texas Online: Idalou, Texas

Cities in Texas
Cities in Lubbock County, Texas
Lubbock metropolitan area
1925 establishments in Texas